The 1563 Act for the Relief of the Poor is a law passed in England under Queen Elizabeth I.  It is a part of the Tudor Poor Laws.

It extended the Poor Act of 1555.  It further provided that those who refused, after exhortation by the bishop, to contribute to poor relief could be bound over by a justice of the peace and assessed fines.

References

English Poor Laws
Acts of the Parliament of England (1485–1603)
1563 in law
1563 in England